Michael Anthony Williams (October 14, 1957 – December 23, 2013) was an American football player who played three seasons with the Kansas City Chiefs of the National Football League (NFL). He was drafted by the Chiefs in the eighth round of the 1979 NFL Draft. He played college football at the University of New Mexico and attended Parkland High School in El Paso, Texas. Williams died of heart failure on December 23, 2013 in El Paso, Texas.

References

External links
Just Sports Stats
College stats

1957 births
2013 deaths
Players of American football from Pennsylvania
American football tight ends
American football fullbacks
African-American players of American football
New Mexico Lobos football players
Kansas City Chiefs players
People from Cumberland County, Pennsylvania
20th-century African-American sportspeople
21st-century African-American people